Jay Ryan Freeman (born November 27, 1981) is an American businessman and software engineer. He is known for creating the Cydia software application and related software for jailbroken iOS—a modified version of Apple's iOS (where OS stands for operating system) that allows for the installation and customization of software outside of the regulation imposed by the App Store system.

Education and early work 

Freeman studied and graduated with a degree in computer science from the College of Creative Studies at the University of California, Santa Barbara. In 2009, he was a doctoral student in computer science at UCSB.

He built Anakrino, a decompiler for .NET available in 2002. He co-authored a paper published in 2005 about a "Java runtime event specification and monitoring library." He has worked with Brian Fox on multiple freelance projects.

Software

iOS 

In February 2008, Freeman released the initial version of Cydia, a software distribution and installation tool for jailbroken iOS devices. In May 2009, he added a proprietary store system to Cydia which allows developers to sell their products. In September 2010, his company (SaurikIT, LLC) announced that it had acquired Rock Your Phone, Inc. (makers of Rock.app). SaurikIT and Rock Your Phone were the two largest providers of third-party apps.

He has published tools for developers to make software, particularly for jailbroken iOS. He made Cydia Substrate, a framework that developers use to help them modify iOS with extensions. He also made Cycript, a tool that developers use to inspect and modify applications on iOS and OS X.

He has developed a plethora of software extensions for jailbroken iOS users to add features to iOS, including Apple File Conduit 2, Cycorder, CyDialer, Cydget, Cyntact, Cyueue, Five Icon Dock, Veency, and WinterBoard. He has also released Cydia Eraser (previously named Cydia Impactor, but was renamed to avoid confusion) for jailbroken iOS, a tool for removing personal data and "unjailbreaking" the device while preserving the iOS version.

He is also a member of the iPhone Dev Team group, which has developed jailbreaks for iOS.

Android 

Freeman has also done software development and security research on the Android OS. In 2008, he ported Debian for use on an Android phone. In April 2013, he built an implementation of a root (jailbreak) for Google Glass and published an analysis of the ramifications. In May 2013, he published a version of Cydia Substrate for Android. In July 2013, he published an analysis and implementation of "Master Key" vulnerabilities for Android.

Politics 

Freeman supported incorporation of Isla Vista, California (the community adjoining UCSB). In January 2016, he announced his candidacy for the Santa Barbara County Board of Supervisors, and in June 2016 he lost in the primary election for that role. He then ran for a four-year seat on the Board of Directors for the Isla Vista Community Services District and was elected in November 2016.

As of 2019, Freeman is also a Special District member of the Santa Barbara County Local Agency Formation Commission and a member of the Goleta Library Advisory Commission.

References 

American computer scientists
IPhone
Living people
1981 births
People from Chicago
People from Isla Vista, California